Harald Hasselbach (born September 22, 1967)  is a former defensive end who played 7 seasons in the NFL for the Denver Broncos. He played for the Broncos from 1994 to 2000 and was a starter in Super Bowl XXXIII. Previously, he played four seasons for the Calgary Stampeders of the CFL and also played in a Grey Cup winning team. He is one of at least ten players to have been a part of a winning team in a Grey Cup and a Super Bowl. In 2016, he was inducted into the B.C. Football Hall of Fame.

Personal life
Hasselbach is a younger brother of the Dutch television presenter Ernst-Paul Hasselbach, who died in a road accident in 2008.

References

1967 births
Living people
American football defensive linemen
Calgary Stampeders players
Canadian football defensive linemen
Dutch players of American football
Dutch players of Canadian football
Dutch sportspeople of Surinamese descent
Denver Broncos players
Sportspeople from Amsterdam
Washington Huskies football players